Kafaz (also Romanized as Kafāz; also known as Kaffāz-e Soflá and Kafās) is a village in Doreh Rural District, in the Central District of Sarbisheh County, South Khorasan Province, Iran. At the 2006 census, its population was 235, in 49 families.

References 

Populated places in Sarbisheh County